The Chelsea Headhunters are a notorious English football hooligan firm linked to the London football club Chelsea.

Background
There is widespread racism amongst the gang and links to various white supremacist organisations, such as Combat 18 and the National Front. The gang also became affiliated with Northern Irish loyalist paramilitary organisations, such as the Ulster Defence Association and Ulster Volunteer Force.

They were infiltrated by investigative reporter Donal MacIntyre for a documentary screened on the BBC on 9 November 1999, in which MacIntyre posed as a wannabe-member of the Chelsea Headhunters. He had a Chelsea tattoo applied to himself for authenticity, although the hardcore were surprised he chose the hated "Millwall lion" badge rather than the 1960s Chelsea erect lion. He confirmed the racism in the Headhunters and their links to Combat 18, including one top-ranking member who had been imprisoned on one occasion for possession of material related to the Ku Klux Klan. The programme led to arrests and several convictions. One member of the Headhunters, Jason Marriner who was convicted and sent to prison as a result of the show, has since written a book, Stitch-Up For a Blue Sole, claiming to have been set up by MacIntyre and the BBC. He claims that footage was manipulated, 'incidents' were manufactured and they were convicted despite having no footage of them committing crimes.

Nick Love's film The Football Factory presented the Headhunters in a fictionalised account. The film focuses mainly on the firm's violent rivalry with the Millwall Bushwackers. Jason Marriner was the subject of a DVD release 'Jason Marriner - Football Hooligan' directed by Liam Galvin (Gangster Toy Videos).

Kevin Whitton, a high-profile member of the firm, was sentenced to life imprisonment on 8 November 1985 for violent assault after being found guilty of involvement in an attack on a pub on King's Road. After Chelsea lost a match, Whitton and other hooligans stormed into the pub, chanting "War! War! War!". When they left a few minutes later, with one of them shouting, "You bloody Americans! Coming here taking our jobs", the bar's American manager, 29-year-old Neil Hansen, was lying on the floor, close to death. Whitton's sentence was cut to three years on appeal on 19 May 1986. The fan responsible for the actual assault, Wandsworth man Terence Matthews (aged 25 at the time), was arrested shortly after Whitton's conviction and remanded in custody to await trial. He was found guilty of taking part in the violence on 13 October 1986 and sentenced to four years in prison. Matthews came to the public attention again in June 2002 when he and his 21-year-old son William received two-year prison sentences after they and another man were convicted of assaulting two police officers in Morden, Surrey.

On 13 February 2010, members of the firm clashed with the Cardiff City Soul Crew at the FA Cup fifth-round tie at Stamford Bridge. On 25 March 2011, at Isleworth  Crown Court, 24 people were convicted of taking part in the violence, which resulted in several people being injured (including a police officer whose jaw was broken). All of those convicted received banning orders from all football grounds in England and Wales ranging from three years to eight years. Eighteen of them received prison sentences of up to two years.

Headhunters were involved in disturbances in Paris before a UEFA Champions League quarter final between Paris Saint-Germain and Chelsea on 2 April 2014. Around 300 hooligans were involved in pre-planned violence around the city, with hardcore hooligans having avoided police detection by entering France via Belgium.

Allies 
In 2000, Chelsea Headhunters formed a temporary alliance with other British hooligans supporting Linfield F.C., Rangers F.C., Cardiff City, Swansea City and Leeds United led by Arsenal's firm, The Herd, to attack Galatasaray fans in Copenhagen and Turkish fans in Brussels during Euro 2000 as part of revenge for the 2000 UEFA Cup semi-final stabbing of two Leeds United fans by a Galatasaray fan. Other allies were supporters of Lazio and Hellas Verona. Chelsea Headhunters 'top boy' ('top' indicating his position within the hierarchy of the hooligan gang) Jason Marriner also appears on a photo alongside Linfield hooligan Randy Ollins in Blaney's autobiography The Undesirables with a caption by Blaney commending the Headhunters on being one of the top firms, indicating a mutual respect between the Headhunters and West Ham United's Inter City firm.

References

Further reading

External links
Chelsea Headhunters Official Website

Headhunters
Headhunters
Organizations established in 1985
1985 establishments in England
Gangs in London